Paradise Manor is a historic home located at Hagerstown, Washington County, Maryland, United States. It is a two-story, six bay brick structure painted white with black trim. Its two easternmost bays are recessed in a double porch which is included under the main roof span. The walls rest on low fieldstone foundations. Also on the property is a large bank barn.

Paradise Manor was listed on the National Register of Historic Places in 1978.

References

External links
, including photo from 1974, at Maryland Historical Trust

Houses on the National Register of Historic Places in Maryland
Houses in Hagerstown, Maryland
National Register of Historic Places in Washington County, Maryland